Jay Clark, Jr. (January 25, 1880 – February 6, 1948) was an American sport shooter who competed in the 1920 Summer Olympics.

In 1920 he won the gold medal as member of the American team in the team clay pigeons competition. He was born in Newton, Iowa and graduated from Grinnell College and Harvard Law School.

References

External links
profile

1880 births
1948 deaths
American male sport shooters
Shooters at the 1920 Summer Olympics
Olympic gold medalists for the United States in shooting
Trap and double trap shooters
Olympic medalists in shooting
People from Newton, Iowa
Medalists at the 1920 Summer Olympics
Grinnell College alumni
Harvard Law School alumni
19th-century American people
20th-century American people